Variazh is a former city (currently a village) in Chervonohrad Raion (district) of Lviv Oblast (province) in western Ukraine. Its population is 888 as of the 2001 Ukrainian Census. The village is located close to the border with Poland, near the Polish village of Uśmierz. It belongs to Sokal urban hromada, one of the hromadas of Ukraine. 

The first written documents date the settlement back to in 1419 as Waręż. In 1538, the settlement was granted the Magdeburg rights. Waręż had a significant population of Jews living in the city: in 1880, there were 880 Jews; in 1900, there were 964 Jews; in 1921, there were 520 Jews. During the Holocaust, Waręż's entire Jewish population was killed.

Until the Soviet invasion of Poland in 1939, Waręż was a part of the Polish Lwów Voivodeship (Sokal County) and – since 1934 – seat of the Gmina Waręż, a rural administrative district of Poland (Waręż does not appear on lists of towns since at least 1931, and prior to this it only had market town status (miasteczko), which was considered a rural unit in an administrative sense).

During the war, the settlement became a part of the Hrubieszów County, which after the war returned to the Lublin Voivodeship. During the 1951 Polish–Soviet territorial exchange, Waręż along with most of the pre-war Sokal County was transferred from the People's Republic of Poland to the Ukrainian Soviet Socialist Republic. There, the settlement was renamed to Novoukrainka, a name which it kept until 1989 when it was reverted to its original—albeit Ukrainian variant of the name, "Variazh."

Until 18 July 2020, Variazh belonged to Sokal Raion. The raion was abolished in July 2020 as part of the administrative reform of Ukraine, which reduced the number of raions of Lviv Oblast to seven. The area of Sokal Raion was merged into Chervonohrad Raion.

People from Variazh
 Yaroslav Mendus, Ukrainian politician

See also
 St. Mark's Church, Variazh

References

External links
 


Populated places established in the 1410s
Lwów Voivodeship
Holocaust locations in Ukraine
Villages in Chervonohrad Raion